James Johnson was an American baseball shortstop in the Negro leagues.  He played with the Baltimore Black Sox, Hilldale Club, Washington Pilots, and Bacharach Giants from 1922 to 1934.

References

External links
 and Seamheads

Baltimore Black Sox players
Bacharach Giants players
Hilldale Club players
Washington Pilots players
Year of birth missing
Year of death missing
Baseball shortstops